Falyonsky/Falensky (masculine), Falyonskaya/Falenskaya (feminine), or Falyonskoye/Falenskoye (neuter) may refer to:
Falyonsky District, a district of Kirov Oblast, Russia
Falenskaya, a rural locality (a village) in Vologda Oblast, Russia